Demnate is a town in central Morocco, located at the foot of the high Atlas Mountains roughly 110 km east of Marrakech. The majority of the population speaks Berber; the local dialect is Tashelheit, as well as Darija and some French. Demnate is the oldest city in the south as it used to be a linking point between the Moroccan south and Marrakech. The Berber villages that surround Demnate are still full of tradition and have some of the most beautiful natural scenes in the entire south. The city is surrounded by beautiful mountains and close by natural attractions, including the natural land bridge Iminifery, dinosaur traces, and the Ouzoud Falls. One of the highest mountains in Morocco (Rat) is located within miles southwest of Demnate.

Economy
Demnate has many weavers and is well known for its deposits of red clay which local artisans make into pottery. Demnate, being a large city, has recognized local authority  many of whom were born in Demnate or close by. The Qayd has an office at the north end of town. There is a large and active police station. Electricity is available 24 hours a day, running water. There is a souk bus station with buses daily to most major cities. Internet and phone in the home is available for a price.

Public services
Demnate has three hospitals and a diabetes center. One public hospital, one children's hospital and a TB prevention and treatment center. Some choose to travel to Marrakesh for major medical treatment. Although the hospitals are free, herbal and home remedies are common and hospital visits are for more extreme or chronic diseases. Tap water is treated and completely safe to drink. People are aware of E. coli and that all meat must be cooked thoroughly.  Hand washing happens, but not regularly or correctly.

As far as social institutions that work with the youth Demnate has three major facilities: the Youth Center, the Environmental Center, and the Women's Center. The Youth Center has an active theater group and computer classes, along with soccer. The environmental center has expositions on environmental concerns and takes kids on field trips to the natural land bride.

References 

Populated places in Azilal Province
Municipalities of Morocco